Major General Cyrus Addie Pithawalla AC, VSM,  is a former General officer of the Indian Army. He was awarded India's highest peacetime decoration for gallantry, the Ashok Chakra, in 1981, and by virtue of this is one of the most decorated flag officers in the history of the Indian Armed Forces (the Ashoka Chakra ranks above all other Indian decorations excepting the Param Vir Chakra, its wartime equivalent, and the Bharat Ratna).

Early life and education
Pithawalla was born in Bengaluru on 13 January 1957 and was educated at the Air Force School, Delhi. He subsequently attended the Delhi University. After graduating with degrees in Commerce, he joined the Officers Training Academy, Chennai.

Career
Pithawalla was commissioned as a Second Lieutenant on a short-service commission into the 17th battalion, Jammu and Kashmir Rifles on 1 September 1979. On 1 September 1984, he received a regular commission as a lieutenant.

On 1 August 2008, Pithawalla became the first recipient of either the Param Vir Chakra or the Ashoka Chakra to attain the one-star rank of Brigadier. Upon promotion to the rank of Major General on 20 January 2013, he became the first Ashoka Chakra recipient to attain the rank of a general officer in a Two-star rank. As a major general, he was posted as the General Officer Commanding (GOC) Andhra Sub Area.

In his 35-year career, he held various instructional, staff and command positions across India. In addition to this, he served as a Military observer in Cambodia as part of the United Nations Transitional Authority in Cambodia mission. He also served as the Deputy Commander of an Infantry Brigade Group in the UN Mission at the Democratic Republic of Congo.

Ashoka Chakra
Pithawalla was awarded the Ashok Chakra in 1981 for a counter-insurgency operation in Manipur. His Ashok Chakra Citation reads as follows:

Awards and decorations

Dates of rank

References 

Recipients of the Vishisht Seva Medal
Living people
Indian Army officers
Recipients of the Ashoka Chakra
1957 births
Ashoka Chakra